Conor Kostick (born 26 June 1964) is an Irish historian and writer living in Dublin. He is the author of many works of history and fiction.

Works
Epic was his first novel and was awarded a place on the International Board on Books for Young People Honours list for 2006 and on the Booklist Best Fantasy Books for Youth list for 2007. The sequel to Epic is Saga, first published in Ireland late in 2006; Edda, published in 2011, completes the 'Avatar Chronicles' trilogy. At their 2009 awards, the Reading Association of Ireland gave him the Special Merit Award 'in recognition of his significant contribution to writing for children in Ireland.'

Career
Conor Kostick was the editor of Socialist Worker in Ireland and a reviewer for the Journal of Music in Ireland. He was twice chairperson of the Irish Writers' Union. He was awarded the Farmleigh writer's residency for the summer of 2010 and a place on the nominees list for the Astrid Lindgren Memorial Award 2012 and 2013.
In 2015, Conor Kostick became Chairperson of the Irish Copyright Licensing Agency and was President of the Irish Jury for the EU Prize for Literature,  and in that year too he was appointed to the Board of the National Library of Ireland. In 2018, the Kerala Literature Festival, India, chose to showcase Irish literature and Conor Kostick was one of seven Irish writers invited to participate. In August that year, he was recruited by the UK's Ockham Publishing to lead a new imprint, Level Up publishing, with a remit to publish LitRPG.
In 2019, Conor Kostick again was president of the Irish Jury of the EU Prize for Literature.

As an historian, Conor Kostick's awards include a gold medal from Trinity College, Dublin, first prize in the 2001 Dublinia Medieval Essay Competition; fellowships from the Irish Research Council and the University of Nottingham; a Marie Curie Career Integration Grant; and, in 2015, the British Academy'''s Rising Star Engagement Award.

He is the brother of the playwright Gavin Kostick and a member of Independent Left.

Games
Conor Kostick was a designer for the world's first live action role-playing game, Treasure Trap. 

A former winner of Manorcon (2000), now one of Europe's grand prix Diplomacy events, Conor Kostick was a member of the Irish team that won the Diplomacy National World Cup in 2012.

Publications

Fiction

The Avatar Chronicles
 Epic (O'Brien Press, 2004; Viking Children's Books, Spring 2007).
 Saga (O'Brien Press, 2009).
 Edda (O'Brien Press/Viking Children's Books, 2011).

Eternal Voyager (mini-ebooks)
 Kudos (Curses & Magic, 2015).
 Aliens (Curses & Magic, 2015).
 Revenge Upon the Vampyres (Curses & Magic, 2015).
 Dancers Beyond the Whorl of Time (Curses & Magic, 2015).
 The Siege of Mettleburg (Curses & Magic, 2015).
 The Murder Mystery (Curses & Magic, 2015).

Other books of fiction
 The Book of Curses (O'Brien Press, 2007, Curses & Magic, 2013).
 Move (O'Brien Press, 2008).
 The Book of Wishes (Curses & Magic, 2013).
 The Dragon's Revenge (Level Up, 2019).
 The Retreat (Red Stag, 2020).

Non-Fiction
On games
 The Art of Correspondence in the Game of Diplomacy (Curses & Magic, 2015).
 Inclusive Yard Games: With Rule Changes for Visually Impaired Players (Curses & Magic, 2020), co-author with Maya Kostick.

Other non-fiction books
 Irish Writers Against War (O'Brien Press, 2003), co-editor with Katherine Moore.
 The Social Structure of the First Crusade (Brill, 2008).
 Revolution in Ireland (Cork University Press, 2009 [1996]).
 The Easter Rising, A Guide to Dublin in 1916 (Fifth Edition: O'Brien Press, 2009 [2000]), with Lorcan Collins.
 The Siege of Jerusalem (Continuum, 2009).
 Medieval Italy, Medieval and Early Modern Women – Essays in Honour of Christine Meek (Four Courts, 2010), editor.
 The Crusades and the Near East: Cultural Histories (Routledge, 2010), editor.
 Strongbow (O'Brien Press, 2013).
 Michael O'Hanrahan (O'Brien Press, 2015).
 Making the Medieval Relevant'' (De Gruyter, 2019), co-editor.

References

External links
 Level Up editor
 EPIC by Conor Kostick at O'Brien Press
 Interview with Kostick as historian
 Interview for readers from Poland
 Interview of Kostick as novelist
 
 

1964 births
Living people
People from Chester
Irish children's writers
Irish Trotskyists
Writers of young adult science fiction
Irish male novelists